Basil Selig Yamey CBE (4 May 1919 – 9 November 2020) was a South African economist and expert in the history of accounting.

Career
He was born in Cape Town in South Africa in May 1919, and educated at the University of Cape Town. For many years he was a professor at the London School of Economics. He was a part-time member of the Monopolies and Mergers Commission from 1966 to 1978, and author of many books and articles, including one on the economics of underdeveloped countries co-authored with Peter Thomas Bauer.

Yamey's interest in rational economic decision-making led him to study historical accounting records. Yamey rejected the claim by Werner Sombart that the double-entry bookkeeping system was a pre-condition, or at least an important stimulating factor, for the emergence of modern capitalism.  Yamey combined his interest in Accounting History with his love of art (he was a trustee of the National Gallery, London from 1974 to 1981 and of the Tate Gallery, London from 1978 to 1981) in his book Art & Accounting, a richly-illustrated survey of paintings portraying commercial scenes and business-people. He died in November 2020 at the age of 101.

Selected bibliography

Journal articles

Books

References 

1919 births
2020 deaths
Academics of the London School of Economics
20th-century South African economists
South African academics
South African Jews
Jewish scientists
Fellows of the British Academy
University of Cape Town alumni
Honorary Fellows of the London School of Economics
South African Commanders of the Order of the British Empire
South African centenarians
Men centenarians